A keel (or in Latin carina), in anatomy, is a structure whose shape resembles the keel of a boat. The term may refer to:

Animal anatomy
 Keel (bird anatomy), a perpendicular extension of a bird's breastbone, to which wing muscles anchor
 Keel (slug), a morphological feature on the back of some land slugs which resembles the keel of an upturned boat
 Keel in a gastropod shell,  a sharp ridge or edge at the shoulder or the center of periphery of the whorls of a snail shell
 The caudal keel in fish anatomy, a strengthening ridge at the base of the tail
 Keeled scales, reptile scales that have a ridge down the center, rather than being smooth

Human anatomy 
 Carina of trachea
 Sagittal keel, a feature of the skull

Plant anatomy 
 Keel (petal), the two bottom petals, below the wings, in flowers of the subfamily Faboideae of the flowering plant family Fabaceae; sometimes joined to form a structure whose shape resembles the keel of a boat

See also 
 Keel (disambiguation)
 Carina (disambiguation)

Animal anatomy